is a badminton player from Japan.

Yonekura won the gold in women's singles of the badminton tournament in the 1998 Bangkok Asian Games, by defeating Gong Zhichao of People's Republic of China in the final.

She played badminton at the 2004 Summer Olympics, losing to Camilla Martin of Denmark in the round of 32.

Achievements

Asian Games 
Women's singles

Asian Championships 
Women's singles

World University Championships 
Women's singles

Women's doubles

IBF World Grand Prix 
The World Badminton Grand Prix has been sanctioned by the International Badminton Federation since 1983.

Women's singles

BWF International Challenge/Series 
Women's singles

 BWF International Challenge tournament
 BWF International Series tournament

References

 Profile at Sankei Sports 

1976 births
Living people
Japanese female badminton players
Olympic badminton players of Japan
Badminton players at the 2000 Summer Olympics
Badminton players at the 2004 Summer Olympics
Sportspeople from Tokyo Metropolis
People from Kodaira, Tokyo
Asian Games medalists in badminton
Badminton players at the 1998 Asian Games
Badminton players at the 2002 Asian Games
Badminton players at the 2006 Asian Games
Asian Games gold medalists for Japan
Asian Games silver medalists for Japan
Asian Games bronze medalists for Japan
Medalists at the 1998 Asian Games
Medalists at the 2006 Asian Games